Michel Picard (born February 15, 1960) is a Canadian politician who served as the Member of Parliament for the riding of Montarville from 2015 until his defeat in the 2019 federal election as a member of the Liberal Party of Canada. During his tenure, he served as Parliamentary Secretary to the Minister of Public Safety and Emergency Preparedness.

Electoral record

References

External links
 Official Website

1960 births
Living people
Liberal Party of Canada MPs
Members of the House of Commons of Canada from Quebec
People from Saint-Bruno-de-Montarville
Academic staff of the Université de Sherbrooke
University of Paris alumni
Université Laval alumni
Canadian crime writers
Writers from Quebec
20th-century Canadian non-fiction writers
20th-century Canadian male writers
21st-century Canadian non-fiction writers
21st-century Canadian politicians
21st-century Canadian male writers
Canadian male non-fiction writers